Osminia fenusaeformis is a moth of the family Sesiidae. It is found on Crete and from Asia Minor to Iran and to the Levant.

The larvae possibly feed on Rumex species.

References

Moths described in 1852
Sesiidae
Moths of Europe
Moths of Asia